Twin Falls is the site of a hydroelectric power station developed by the British Newfoundland Development Corporation (Brinco) to deliver power to mining operations in Labrador City and Wabush.

The station was on the Unknown River, a tributary of the Churchill River that drains the central Labrador basin. Construction began in 1960. The river was dammed at Twin Falls to form the Ossokmanuan Reservoir. It cost $47.5 million (1963).

Twin Falls power was essential to the later development at Churchill Falls. It helped open up the area and supplied the power required during the construction phase of the project. In the planning stage, however, it became apparent that greater efficiency in the production of electricity could be achieved by diverting the flow of water from the Ossokmanuan Reservoir into the Smallwood Reservoir. Utilizing this water at the Churchill Falls plant enabled approximately three times as much electricity to be produced from the same volume of water. In July 1974 the Twin Falls plant was put into extended shutdown and the water diverted into the Smallwood Reservoir under an agreement with Churchill Falls Labrador Corporation Limited (CFLCo).

Aerodrome

References

Hydroelectric power stations in Newfoundland and Labrador
Labrador
Waterfalls of Newfoundland and Labrador
Churchill Falls
Defunct airports in Newfoundland and Labrador